The following is a list of massacres that took place in the Soviet Union. For massacres that took place in countries that were once part of the Soviet Union, see the list of massacres in that country.

See also 
 List of massacres in Russia
 Mass killings in the Soviet Union
 The Holocaust in Russia
 The Holocaust in Belarus
 The Holocaust in Ukraine
 World War II casualties of the Soviet Union

References

Further reading
 
 
 
 
 

 
Soviet Union
Massacres